Christianity is a minority religion in Shandong province of China. Christianity in Henan, Christianity in Anhui and Christianity in Jiangsu are other major provincial Christian populations. 
Cheeloo University is defunct. St. Michael's Cathedral, Qingdao and Sacred Heart Cathedral (Jinan) are churches of European style. Another European-style church is due to be built in Qufu, where Confucius originated. This idea was or is opposed by Confucianist groups. 
There is official action against house churches.

Roman Catholic dioceses with seat in Shandong 
Roman Catholic Archdiocese of Jinan
Roman Catholic Diocese of Caozhou
Roman Catholic Diocese of Qingdao
Roman Catholic Diocese of Yanggu
Roman Catholic Diocese of Yantai
Roman Catholic Diocese of Yanzhou
Roman Catholic Diocese of Yizhou
Roman Catholic Diocese of Zhoucun

See also 
Spirit Church
 Christianity in Shandong's neighbouring provinces
 Christianity in Anhui
 Christianity in Hebei
 Christianity in Henan
 Christianity in Jiangsu

References

Religion in Shandong
Christianity in China by location